Nafis Ahmad (1911-1982) was a Bangladeshi geographer and educationalist.

Early life
Ahmad was born in 1911 in British India. He finished his undergrad in 1934 and masters in 1935 from the Aligarh Muslim University. In 1953, he finished his PhD from the London School of Economics.

Career
In 1936, Ahmad joined Aligarh Muslim University as a lecturer of Geography. From 1940 to 1947, he served as the head of the Geography Department at the Islamia College, Calcutta. He published two books, Basis of Pakistan and Muslim Contribution to Geography, in 1947. In 1948, he was appointed the first head of the geography department of the Dhaka University. From 1964 to 1966, he was the Dean of the Faculty of Science at Dhaka University. He was the founding president of Bangladesh Geographical Society in 1955, then known as East Pakistan Geographical Society. He is a fellow at the American Geographical Society and the Royal Geographical Society.

Ahmad published Economic Geography of East Pakistan in 1958. The book was renamed to the Economic Geography of Bangladesh after the Independence of Bangladesh. It was expanded and republished in 1978. In 1961, the President of Pakistan awarded him the "Medal of Distinction". He retired from Dhaka University in 1971. He taught in a number of universities in Lahore and Karachi.

Death
Ahmad died on 31 May 1982 in Dhaka, Bangladesh.

References

1911 births
1982 deaths
Bangladeshi geographers
Academic staff of the University of Dhaka
20th-century geographers